Alfred Patrick  (1810/1811 – July 18, 1892) was the second Clerk of the House of Commons of Canada, having served from 1873 to 1880.

In the 1882 Birthday Honours, he was created a Companion of the Order of St Michael and St George.

References

19th-century Canadian civil servants
Clerks of the House of Commons (Canada)
1810s births
1892 deaths
Canadian Companions of the Order of St Michael and St George